Yaanai Paagan is a 1960 Indian Tamil-language film directed by M. A. Thirumugam. The film stars Udaykumar and B. Saroja Devi. It was released on 19 October 1960.

Plot

Cast 
Adapted from the database of Film News Anandan.

Udaykumar
B. Saroja Devi
P. S. Veerappa
Manorama
Jayanthi
S. V. Subbaiah
S. D. Subbulakshmi
V. R. Rajagopal
Sandow M. M. A. Chinnappa Thevar

Dubbed versions 
The film was dubbed into Telugu and released in 1961 as Evaru Donga and into Hindi, also released in 1961, as Mahavat.

Soundtrack 
The music was composed by K. V. Mahadevan while the lyrics were penned by A. Maruthakasi, Kovai Kumaradevan, Puratchidasan and Alangudi Somu.

Reception 
The Sunday Standard appreciated the locations, cinematography and performances of the cast.

References

External links 
 

1960s Tamil-language films
Films about elephants
Films directed by M. A. Thirumugam
Films scored by K. V. Mahadevan
Indian adventure films